A meerkat is a small mammal.

Meerkat may also refer to:
 Meerkat (app), a live-streaming mobile application
 Meerkat (vehicle), a mine-detection vehicle
 MeerKAT, a radio telescope in South Africa

See also
 Compare the Meerkat, a UK advertising campaign
 Maverick Meerkat, an Ubuntu release
 Meerkat Manor, a British television programme
 Mercat cross, the Scots name for a market cross
 Mercat Cross, Edinburgh